Asigra Inc. is a company that produces a cloud backup and recovery software platform known as Asigra Cloud Backup. The company is privately held and is headquartered in Toronto, Canada.

History
The company was founded in 1986 by David Farajun after a hard-drive failure caused the loss of his company's data.  He decided to develop technology to back up data to a secure location over communication lines, hence establishing Asigra.

The name Asigra comes from the Spanish infinitive asegurar, meaning to assure.

Business model
Asigra sells its products to value added resellers, managed service providers, and telcos, who use the software to run cloud backup services for consumers, small and medium businesses and large enterprises.

These service providers are free to structure their business operations, pricing, and cloud deployment models independently. They can choose to sell the software as a service (SaaS) or as either a physical or virtual appliance to their customers in any one of the cloud deployment models – public, private, or hybrid.

Product
Asigra Cloud Backup is the company's only product. It contains various backup and recovery modules, based on the data sources that need to be backed up. The price of the product is based on the amount of data that is stored in compressed, deduplicated and encrypted form at the backup repository.

Alliances
NetApp and Asigra sell Data Protection as a Service (DPaaS) to cloud services providers. The company has also developed products with Cisco and Intel, which are designed for distributed remote offices and the small and medium business spaces, respectively.

The Asigra platform runs in the IBM SmartCloud infrastructure as a service (IaaS) platform and can back up and recover data to and from machines in the IBM SmartCloud.

Licensing models
Asigra introduced the patent pending Recovery License Model® (RLM) on July 10, 2013 to address rising storage costs stemming from growing data volume. This licensing model allows users to pay based on data recovered.

The Capacity License Model (CLM), introduced in 1992, is based on the amount of data stored and is the prevalent pricing model used in the market today by most vendors in the backup and recovery industry. Asigra provides organizations the option to choose between the current CLM or the new RLM based on the organizations' business needs.

Awards and recognition
The Asigra software has been featured in the Gartner Magic Quadrant for Enterprise Backup and Recovery Software for two years in a row.

It has won various awards, including the 2012 North American New Product Innovation Award in Cloud-Based Data Management from Frost & Sullivan, the Storage Magazine Gold "Product of the Year" in the Enterprise backup category, and a 5 star rating for its channel partner program from CRN Magazine.

References

External links 

Asigra

Business continuity
Data protection
Cloud computing providers
Companies based in Toronto